Propebela exarata is a species of sea snail, a marine gastropod mollusk in the family Mangeliidae.

Description
The length of the shell attains 12 mm.

The white shell has an ovate-fusiform shape and is clathrate. It contains 6 whorls. The longitudinal ribs are eminently pronounced and are crossed by transverse plicae.

Distribution
This marine species occurs off Massachusetts, USA, Greenland, the Lofoten Islands and Nova Zembla, in the Kara Sea and the Arctic shores of Siberia; Arctic Ocean to Monterey, California

Fossils have been found in Greenland, Labrador, England and Spitsbergen.

References

 Bogdanov, I. P. Mollusks of Oenopotinae subfamily (Gastropoda, Pectinibranchia, Turridae) in the seas of the USSR. Nauka, 1990.

External links
 
 Friele H., 1877: Preliminary report on the Mollusca from the Norwegian North Atlantic Expedition in 1876; Nyt Magazin for Naturvidenskaberne 23: 1–10, 1 pl. 
  Dall, William Healey. Summary of the marine shellbearing mollusks of the northwest coast of America: from San Diego, California, to the Polar Sea, mostly contained in the collection of the United States National Museum, with illustrations of hitherto unfigured species. No. 112. Govt. print. off., 1921   
 Nekhaev, Ivan O. "Marine shell-bearing Gastropoda of Murman (Barents Sea): an annotated check-list." Ruthenica 24.2 (2014): 75

exarata
Gastropods described in 1842